Philip S. Straniere (born 1947 or 1948 ) is a current civil court judge for the Staten Island Civil Court in New York City, having been elected to the post in 1997.  Straniere is known for his humorous opinions and references to popular culture. Filing and Winning Small Claims For Dummies is a guidebook written by him.

References

Living people
American judges
1940s births